Alma McLaughlin, known in the Dominican Republic as Alma McLaughlin Simó de Trujillo and in the United States as Alma McLaughlin Trujillo, (5 August 1921 – 13 February 2018) was a Dominican public figure and wife of former President Héctor Trujillo. She served as the First Lady of the Dominican Republic from 12 December 1959 to 4 August 1960.

McLaughlin was born within an upper-class white family in San Cristóbal, Dominican Republic. Her father was Col. Charles McLaughlin, an American marine who arrived in the Dominican Republic during the United States occupation of the Dominican Republic (1916–1924), while her mother was Zaida Simó Clark, of English heritage.

McLaughlin met and engaged in 1937 with Héctor Trujillo, who was 13 years her senior, at age 16. However, they did not marry until 1959 when he was President of the country as Trujillo's elder brother (Rafael Trujillo) did not consent their marriage, as he expected Héctor, his junior brother, to take care of their elderly mother instead of marrying.

McLaughlin and her husband exiled in Estoril, Portugal in 1961 and relocated first to Panama and later to Miami, United States. Trujillo died in 2002 and McLaughlin died in a nursing home in 2018.

References

1921 births
2018 deaths
First ladies of the Dominican Republic
Dominican Republic expatriates in Panama
Dominican Republic expatriates in Portugal
Dominican Republic expatriates in the United States
Dominican Republic people of English descent
Dominican Republic people of European American descent
Dominican Republic people of Irish descent
People from San Cristóbal Province
White Dominicans